The National Scholastic Press Association (NSPA) is a nonprofit organization founded in 1921 for high school and secondary school publications in the United States. The association is membership-based and annually hosts high school journalism conventions across the country. The NSPA is considered to be one of the most prestigious award bodies in high school journalism, comparable to the Pulitzer Prize.

The NSPA scores publications in five areas: Concept & Essentials; Content; Writing and Editing; Photography, Art and Graphics; and Layout. Judges account for differences among literary, feature and specialty magazines and score accordingly. For example, if photography is not included in a literary magazine, the score will not suffer since the artwork and graphics will be evaluated for the score in this section. Marks of Distinction will be given for accomplishments of extraordinary merit.

To receive the highest All-American Award, the magazine must earn at least four Marks of Distinction and 450 points out of a highest point total of 500 points. About five percent of all entries receive the coveted All-American Award.

Other Awards and Contests:
In these categories, there are multiple awards every year:
Newspaper Pacemaker
Online Pacemakers
Yearbook/Magazine Pacemakers
Broadcast Pacemakers
Individual Awards
Story of the Year
Brasler Prize
Picture of the Year
Design of the Year
Broadcast Story of the Year
Cartooning Awards
Convention Best of Show
Journalism Honor Roll
Wikoff Scholarship
H.L. Hall/Melinda Foys Adviser Fellowships
RFK Journalism Award
Courage in Student Journalism
Pioneer Award

External links
National Scholastic Press Association

Organizations established in 1921
1921 establishments in the United States